Wolf Stegemann (born 2 October 1944, modern-day Aš, Czech Republic) is a German journalist, author, and poet.

Life
After finishing school in Rothenburg ob der Tauber and being a Volontariat in Nuremberg and Munich, Stegemann worked as a journalist in Athens and Istanbul for the Deutsche Presse-Agentur between 1970 and 1971 and as a freelance court reporters in Munich. From 1972 to 1975, he was a book editor at Bad Reichenhall, publishing the multi-volume series Sakrale Kunst in Bayern. From 1975 to 1980, he was an art editor in Gelsenkirchen in Dorsten (Ruhr Nachrichten) from 1981 to 1998.

He published the Stadtansichten Gelsenkirchen. Von Menschen, Musen und Maloche.

Together with Dirk Hartwich, Stegemann founded a Dorsten-based research group which explored the Nazi period in the region. This group, along with other contributors, released a series of books from 1983 to 1987. In 1987, he was creative director and co-founder of the Jewish Museum of Westphalia in Dorsten and, in 1992, part of the German-Israeli Friends of Dorsten-Hod Hasharon. Stegemann received a lifetime achievement in 2005 by the abc Society for the Advancement of learning to read and write in the 3rd World eV the award of Change. Since 1970 his publications in have reached German-language magazines in Switzerland, Austria, Germany, Israel, USA, and on the radio at WDR, ZDF, Deutschland Rundfunk, Bayerischer Rundfunk, Südwestfunk, Österreichischer Rundfunk, and Deutsche Welle. He resides in Dorsten.

Bibliography

Author or co-editor

Poetry and prose volumes
 Schreibmaschinentypen & sonst nichts, 1971
 Auf der Suche nach einem abgeschlossenen Raum, 1978
 Empor ins Reich der Edelmenschen. 1912 besuchte Hitler in Wien einen Vortrag von Karl May. Eine Erzählung nach einer wahren Begebenheit, 2000
 Heute mich, morgen dich. Eine Geschichte mit Scherenschnitten, 2007

Exhibition catalogs
 Alija. Die Wiedergeburt Israels in Dalis Bilderzyklus, Wanderausstellung 1993
 Igor Ganikowski: Zeit und Erinnerung, 1993
 Die Schulenburgs. Eine Familie zwischen Hochverrat und Widerstand, Wanderausstellung 1994
 Und neues Leben blüht aus Ruinen. Dokumentation zum Wiederaufbau der Stadt Dorsten, 1994
 Faszination Jerusalem. Stadt der Sehnsucht und der Hoffnung, Fotoausstellung 1994
 ''JOLENTA Dorszewska Pötting „Kräfte der Natur. Malerei., Impressions of Kashubia exhibition in the European Parliament 2003

External links
 Rothenburg under the Swastika
 Dorsten Lexicon of Wolf Stegemann
  Wolf Stegemann's website
 Dictionary entry of Westphalian authors
 Dorsten under the Swastika
  Local Political online magazine of Wolf Stegemann

References

1944 births
Living people
People from Aš
People from Sudetenland
Sudeten German people
German journalists
German poets